La Panza (Spanish for "The Belly"), is a populated place, formerly a gold boom town, in San Luis Obispo County, California.  It lies in the La Panza Range at an elevation of 1880 feet (573m).  La Panza derives from a Spanish word for paunch of beef, that Californio hunters used to lure bears.  The location was recorded in 1828, with the name paraje la panza (the paunch place).

History
The discovery of placer gold in La Panza Canyon in 1878 began a small gold rush and La Panza grew into a gold mining boomtown.  It had its own post office from November 4, 1879, to June 15, 1908.

The site today
One dilapidated building remains at the site, on private property, and can be seen from the Pozo Road.  Placer gold mining and quartz mining claims are still worked in the vicinity.

References

Former settlements in San Luis Obispo County, California
Ghost towns in California